Douglas Clarence Johnson (2 December 1920 – 19 October 2002) was an Australian rules footballer who played with North Melbourne in the Victorian Football League (VFL).

Notes

External links 

1920 births
2002 deaths
Australian rules footballers from Melbourne
North Melbourne Football Club players
Brunswick Football Club players
People from Werribee, Victoria